= Brigida v. FAA =

United States discrimination case

- Court: United States District Court for the District of Arizona United States District Court for the District of Columbia
- Full case name: Andrew J Brigida, Plaintiff, v. United States Department of Transportation, et al., Defendants.

Brigida v. United States Department of Transportation et al, No. 1:2016cv02227, is a class action, racial discrimination lawsuit that was filed in the United States in November 2016. The lead plaintiff is Andrew Brigida. The plaintiffs, in total about 1,000, accused the Federal Aviation Administration of racially discriminating against them when they applied to be air-traffic controllers.
